Cecilia Gyan Amoah (born 26 October 1947) is a Ghanaian educator, diplomat and politician who represented the Asutifi South Constituency in the Parliament of Ghana from 2001 to 2005.

Politics
She won the Asutifi South Constituency during the 2000 parliamentary elections on the ticket of the New Patriotic Party (NPP), defeating incumbent Collins Dauda of the National Democratic Congress.

Amoah was the member of parliament for the Asutifi South Constituency from January 2001 to January 2005. This was following the death of her husband in 2000, who had previously stood for the party in that district. She left the ticket after a loss in the primary for the party in late 2004 to Thomas Broni, deputy Minister for the Interior. She was the first female MP of the NPP to be voted off a ticket.

She also served as Ghana's ambassador to Cuba, becoming High Commissioner to Barbados afterwards. On 13 June 2015, Amoah won the Asutifi South constituency New Patriotic Party parliamentary primaries to represent the party again in the Ghanaian general election in 2016. However, one member of her late husband's family (a distant cousin) did not support her attempt to return, calling the incumbent Collins Dauda "dangerous". Amoah had accused her opposition party of using intimidation tactics after claiming they sent men to assault NPP polling agents. Amoah and several others were later attacked by unknown assailants, who destroyed several bicycles in their care.

2000 Elections 
Amoah was elected as the member of parliament for the Asutifi South constituency in the 2000 Ghanaian general elections. She was elected on the ticket of the New Patriotic Party. Her constituency was a part of the 14 parliamentary seats out of 21 seats won by the New Patriotic Party in that election for the Brong Ahafo Region. The New Patriotic Party won a majority total of 100 parliamentary seats out of 200 seats in the 3rd parliament of the 4th republic of Ghana. She was elected with 8,220 votes out of 16,089 total valid votes cast. This was equivalent to 51.6% of the total valid votes cast. She was elected over Collins Dauda of the National Democratic Congress, Alfred Osei Nkrumah of the National Reform Party, Alex Osei Amankwaa of the Convention People's Party, and Kwabena Yeboah of the People's National Convention. These obtained 14,326, 359, 245, 207 and 200 votes respectively out of the total valid votes cast. These were equivalent to 57.5%, 39.7%, 1.0%,  0.7%, 0.6% and 0.6% respectively of total valid votes cast.

References

1947 births
Living people
Ghanaian MPs 2001–2005
Ghanaian educators
New Patriotic Party politicians
Women members of the Parliament of Ghana
Ambassadors of Ghana to Cuba
High Commissioners of Ghana to Barbados
Ghanaian women ambassadors
21st-century Ghanaian politicians
21st-century Ghanaian women politicians